Karłowice may refer to the following places in Poland:
Karłowice, Lower Silesian Voivodeship (south-west Poland)
Karłowice, Greater Poland Voivodeship (west-central Poland)
Karłowice, Opole Voivodeship (south-west Poland)